Clarence A. Lamoreux (September 20, 1860December 5, 1945) was an American lawyer, judge, and Republican politician.  He was a member of the Wisconsin State Senate, representing the 12th Senate district during the 1897 and 1899 sessions.

Biography

Born in Portage County, Wisconsin, Lamoreux lived in Dodge County, Wisconsin from 1861 until 1880. He then moved to Cumberland, Wisconsin in 1880. He was admitted to the Wisconsin bar in 1881. Lamoreux was the editor of the Cumberland Herald newspaper from 1881 to 1884. He also served as postmaster for Cumberland, Wisconsin. Lamoreux moved to Ashland, Wisconsin and continued to practice law. From 1897 to 1901, Clarence Lamoreux served in the Wisconsin State Senate and was a Republican. Lamoreux also served as the Ashland County judge. Lamoreux died in a hospital in Ashland, Wisconsin from a heart ailment.

Personal life and family
Clarence Lamoreux is a son of Martin Van Buren Lamoreux and his first wife, Mary Jane ( Higgins).  Silas W. Lamoreux and Oliver Lamoreux were brothers of Martin Lamoreux.

Clarence Lamoreux married twice.  He married Isabelle Lawrence in 1881.  With Isabelle Lawrence, he had one son, Lawrence A. Lamoreux, who also went on to serve in the Wisconsin Assembly.  Isabelle Lawrence died in 1926, and Clarence then married Hariet A. Duerr in 1928.

References

1860 births
1945 deaths
People from Portage County, Wisconsin
People from Dodge County, Wisconsin
People from Cumberland, Wisconsin
People from Ashland, Wisconsin
Editors of Wisconsin newspapers
Wisconsin lawyers
Wisconsin state court judges
Republican Party Wisconsin state senators
Wisconsin postmasters
19th-century American newspaper editors
19th-century American lawyers